Qasemabad-e Pir Almas (also Romanized as Qāsemābād-e Pīr Almās; also known as Qāsemābād and Qāsemābād-e Gonbagī) is a relatively small village in Gonbaki Rural District, Gonbaki District, Rigan County, Kerman Province, Iran. At the 2006 census, its population was 713, in 156 families.

References 

Populated places in Rigan County